Formula Tag was a 74-foot waterline length catamaran that was sailed across the Atlantic ocean in 1984.

See also
 List of multihulls

References

Catamarans
1980s sailing yachts